The IHP Airpistol 0.177 (also known as IHP Scout) is a single shot .177 calibre break barrel, spring-piston air pistol. It is manufactured by National rifles division of the Indian Hume Pipe Co. Ltd of Ahmedabad, India. This gun has open micro adjustable sights with globe sight on the front. It has an adjustable trigger and a rifled barrel although not designed for high-precision shooting. The Pistol grip is wooden and heavy but not ergonomic. The gun can not be dry-fired without charging.

See also 
National CO2 Air Pistol (.177)
IHP PCP Air Pistol (.177)
Pellet (air gun)

References

Bibliography

External links 
 Manufacturer's Website

Air guns of India
Shooting sports equipment